HD 59640 is a solitary white hued star located in the southern circumpolar constellation Volans. It has an apparent magnitude of 6.48, placing it near the limit for naked eye visibility. At its current distance, HD 59640's brightness is diminished by three tenths of a magnitude due to interstellar dust.

This is an ordinary A-type main-sequence star with a stellar classification of A3 V. It has 1.82 times the mass of the Sun and 1.77 times its radius. HD 59640 has an iron abundance 63% that of the Sun, making it metal deficient. In 2020, Maximillian N. Günther and colleagues found the object to be an eruptive variable star with flares lasting up to 10 minutes. However, they are rather small, with the maximum being only two hundredths of a magnitude.

References

A-type main-sequence stars
Eruptive variables
Suspected variables
Volans (constellation)
Volantis, 11
CD-71 00402
059640
035946